Dehgah (also Romanized as Dehgāh) is a village in Badranlu Rural District, in the Central District of Bojnord County, North Khorasan Province, Iran. At the 2006 census, its population was 1,581, in 389 families.

References 

Populated places in Bojnord County